$25 Million Dollar Hoax is an unscripted television series that was originally shown on American network NBC in November 2004.

The series is noted to be similar in style to FOX's My Big Fat Obnoxious Fiance, which aired in 2003. It is based on a United Kingdom show titled The Million Pound Hoax, broadcast on Sky One earlier that year.

Synopsis 
In the series, daughter Chrissy Sanford plays a hoax on her family by convincing them she had won a $25,000,000 lottery prize through the internet, and that it had changed her from a sweet girl into a spend-a-holic.

$25 Million Dollar Hoax contained guest appearances by Ed McMahon, George Gray, and N*SYNC's Lance Bass.

Chrissy successfully pulled off the hoax, which won her and her family over $400,000 in cash and prizes.

Cast 
 Chrissy Sanford – As herself
 Guy Sanford (father) – As himself
 Lois Sanford (mother) – As herself
 Paul Sanford (brother) – As himself
 Eric Sanford (brother) – As himself
 Andrew Sanford (brother) – As himself
 David Sanford (brother) – As himself
 Phillip Sanford (brother) – As himself
 Matthew Sanford (brother) – As himself
 Jameson Karns (friend) – As himself
 Ed McMahon – As himself
 George Gray – As himself
 Lance Bass – As himself

Overseas broadcasts 
: Global

References

External links 
 
 

2004 American television series debuts
2004 American television series endings
2000s American reality television series
American television series based on British television series
English-language television shows
NBC original programming
Television series by Reveille Productions